This is a list of award winners and league leaders for the San Diego Padres professional baseball team.

Award winners

NL Most Valuable Player

 – Ken Caminiti

NL Cy Young

 – Randy Jones
 – Gaylord Perry
 – Mark Davis
 – Jake Peavy

NL Rookie of the Year

 1976 – Butch Metzger
 – Benito Santiago

Wilson Defensive Player of the Year Award

See explanatory note at Atlanta Braves award winners and league leaders.
Team (at all positions)
 (2012)
 (2013)

MLB Delivery Man of the Year Award

Heath Bell (2010)

NL Rolaids Relief Man of the Year Award

See footnote
Rollie Fingers (1977, 1978, 1980)
Mark Davis (1989)
Trevor Hoffman (1998, 2006)
Heath Bell (2009, 2010)

NL Championship Series (NLCS) MVP Award

1984 – Steve Garvey
1998 – Sterling Hitchcock

DHL Hometown Heroes (2006)

Tony Gwynn — voted by MLB fans as the most outstanding player in the history of the franchise, based on on-field performance, leadership quality and character value

Best Major League Baseball Player ESPY Award

Ken Caminiti (1997)

Topps All-Star Rookie teams

Branch Rickey Award

1995 – Tony Gwynn
2008 – Trevor Hoffman

Baseball Prospectus Internet Baseball Awards NL Manager of the Year
See: Baseball Prospectus#Internet Baseball Awards
Bud Black (2010)

Team award
 – National League West Division title
 – Warren C. Giles Trophy (National League champion)
 – National League West Division title
 – National League West Division title
 – Warren Giles Trophy (National League champion)
 – National League West Division title
 – National League West Division title

 	 
| colspan = 3 align = center | National League Champions 	 
|- 	 
| width = 30% align = center | Preceded by:Florida Marlins 
| width = 40% align = center | 1998
| width = 30% align = center | Succeeded by:Atlanta Braves 	 
|- 
| width = 30% align = center | Preceded by:Philadelphia Phillies 
| width = 40% align = center | 1984
| width = 30% align = center | Succeeded by:St. Louis Cardinals 
|- 	 
| colspan = 3 align = center | National League Western Division Champions 	 
|- 	 
| width = 30% align = center | Preceded by:Los Angeles Dodgers 
| width = 40% align = center | 2005 & 2006	 
| width = 30% align = center | Succeeded by:Arizona Diamondbacks 	 
|- 	 
| width = 30% align = center | Preceded by:San Francisco Giants	 
| width = 40% align = center | 1998 	 
| width = 30% align = center | Succeeded by:Arizona Diamondbacks 
|-
| width = 30% align = center | Preceded by:Los Angeles Dodgers
| width = 40% align = center | 1996 	 
| width = 30% align = center | Succeeded by:San Francisco Giants 
|- 
| width = 30% align = center | Preceded by:Los Angeles Dodgers 
| width = 40% align = center | 1984 	 
| width = 30% align = center | Succeeded by:Los Angeles Dodgers
|-

Team records (single-season and career)

Minor-league system

MiLB Overall Team of the Year

2009 – Fort Wayne TinCaps

Other achievements

Hall of Famers
See: San Diego Padres#Baseball Hall of Famers

Ford C. Frick Award (broadcasters)

Jerry Coleman (2005)

Team Hall of Fame
See: San Diego Padres Hall of Fame

Retired numbers
See: 

California Sports Hall of Fame

Best Breakthrough Athlete ESPY Award

Gary Sheffield (1993)

Breitbard Hall of FameSee: Breitbard Hall of Fame''
Buzzie Bavasi (2007)
Goose Gossage (2007)
Tony Gwynn (2002)
Randy Jones (1996)
David Winfield (1998)

National League statistical leaders (batting)

Batting Average
 – Tony Gwynn (.351)
1987 – Tony Gwynn (.370)
1988 – Tony Gwynn (.313)
1989 – Tony Gwynn (.336)
1992 – Gary Sheffield (.330)
1994 – Tony Gwynn (.394)
1995 – Tony Gwynn (.368)
1996 – Tony Gwynn (.353)
1997 – Tony Gwynn (.372)

Runs
1986 – Tony Gwynn (107) co-leader

RBI
1979 – Dave Winfield (118)

Hits
1984 – Tony Gwynn (213)
1986 – Tony Gwynn (211)
1987 – Tony Gwynn (218)
1989 – Tony Gwynn (203)
1994 – Tony Gwynn (165)
1995 – Tony Gwynn (197) co-leader
1997 – Tony Gwynn (220)

On-base percentage
1994 – Tony Gwynn (.454)

Times on Base
1987 – Tony Gwynn (303)

Total Bases
1979 – Dave Winfield (333)
1992 – Gary Sheffield (323)

Home Runs
 1992 – Fred McGriff (35)
 2021 – Fernando Tatís Jr. (42)

Triples
1981 – Gene Richards (12) co-leader

Singles
1980 – Gene Richards (155)
1984 – Tony Gwynn (177)
1986 – Tony Gwynn (157) co-leader
1987 – Tony Gwynn (162)
1989 – Tony Gwynn (165)
1994 – Tony Gwynn (117)
1995 – Tony Gwynn (154)
1997 – Tony Gwynn (152)

Hit By Pitch
1977 – Gene Tenace (13)

Walks
1977 – Gene Tenace (125)
1989 – Jack Clark (132)
1990 – Jack Clark (104)
2005 – Brian Giles (119)

Intentional Walks
1979 – Dave Winfield (24)
1984 – Garry Templeton (23)
1985 – Garry Templeton (24) co-leader
1991 – Fred McGriff (26)

Sacrifice Hits
1970 – Pat Dobson (19)
1975 – Enzo Hernández (24)
1977 – Bill Almon (20)
1978 – Ozzie Smith (28)
1980 – Ozzie Smith (23)
1989 – Roberto Alomar (17)

Sacrifice Flies
1984 – Steve Garvey (10) co-leader
1984 – Carmelo Martínez (10) co-leader
1996 – Ken Caminiti (10) co-leader
1997 – Tony Gwynn (12) co-leader
2004 – Mark Loretta (16)

Grounded into Double Plays
1984 – Steve Garvey (25)
1991 – Benito Santiago (21)
1992 – Darrin Jackson (21)
1994 – Tony Gwynn (20)
2006 – Adrián González (24) co-leader

Outs
1981 – Ozzie Smith (381)
1990 – Joe Carter (513)

Games
1981 – Ozzie Smith (110) co-leader
1985 – Steve Garvey (162) co-leader
1990 – Joe Carter (162)

At Bats
1981 – Ozzie Smith (450)
1986 – Tony Gwynn (642)
1990 – Joe Carter (634)

At Bats per Strikeout
1984 – Tony Gwynn (26.3)
1989 – Tony Gwynn (20.1)
1990 – Tony Gwynn (24.9)
1991 – Tony Gwynn (27.9)
1992 – Tony Gwynn (32.5)
1994 – Tony Gwynn (22.1)
1995 – Tony Gwynn (35.7)
1996 – Tony Gwynn (26.5)
1997 – Tony Gwynn (21.1)
1998 – Tony Gwynn (25.6)

National League statistical leaders (pitching)

ERA
 – Randy Jones (2.24)
2004 – Jake Peavy (2.27)
2007 – Jake Peavy (2.54)

Wins
1976 – Randy Jones (22)
1978 – Gaylord Perry (21)
2007 – Jake Peavy (19)

Won-Loss %
1978 – Gaylord Perry (.778)

Complete Games
1976 – Randy Jones (25)
1989 – Bruce Hurst (10) co-leader

Shutouts
1990 – Bruce Hurst (4) co-leader
1999 – Andy Ashby (3)

Saves
1977 – Rollie Fingers (35)
1978 – Rollie Fingers (37)
1989 – Mark Davis (44)
1998 – Trevor Hoffman (53)
2006 – Trevor Hoffman (46)

Strikeouts
1994 – Andy Benes (189)
2005 – Jake Peavy (216)
2007 – Jake Peavy (240)

Strikeouts/9IP
1994 – Andy Benes (9.87)
2006 – Jake Peavy (9.56)
2007 – Jake Peavy (9.67)

Home Runs Allowed
1987 – Ed Whitson (36)
1990 – Dennis Rasmussen (28)
2001 – Kevin Jarvis (37) co-leader
2001 – Bobby Jones (37) co-leader

Hits Allowed
1976 – Randy Jones (274)
1992 – Andy Benes (230)

Hits Allowed/9IP
2006 – Chris Young (6.72)

WHIP (Walks plus hits per inning pitched)
1976 – Randy Jones (1.027)

Walks Allowed
1972 – Steve Arlin (122)
1998 – Joey Hamilton (106)
2000 – Matt Clement (125)

Walks/9IP
1985 – LaMarr Hoyt (.86)
2004 – David Wells (.92)
2007 – Greg Maddux (1.10)

Hit Batsmen
1974 – Bill Greif (14)

Wild Pitches
1972 – Steve Arlin (15)
1994 – Scott Sanders (10) co-leader
1999 – Sterling Hitchcock (15) co-leader
2000 – Matt Clement (23)

Innings
1976 – Randy Jones

Games
1977 – Rollie Fingers (78)
1981 – Gary Lucas (57)
1986 – Craig Lefferts (83)

Games Started
1976 – Randy Jones (40)
1995 – Andy Ashby (31) co-leader
1998 – Kevin Brown (35) co-leader

Games Finished
1976 – Butch Metzger (62)
1977 – Rollie Fingers (69)
1989 – Mark Davis (65)

Losses
1969 – Clay Kirby (20)
1971 – Steve Arlin (19)
1972 – Steve Arlin (21)
1974 – Randy Jones (22) co-leader
1981 – Steve Mura (14) co-leader
1994 – Andy Benes (14)
2001 – Bobby Jones (19)

Batters Faced
1976 – Randy Jones (1,251)

National League statistical leaders (age)

Oldest Player
2003 – Jesse Orosco (46)

Youngest Player
1971 – Jay Franklin (18)
1977 – Brian Greer (18)

See also
Baseball awards
List of Major League Baseball awards

Footnotes

Awa
Major League Baseball team trophies and awards